Kim Yoon-seo (born Kim Ga-eun on March 28, 1986) is a South Korean actress.

Career
Kim made her acting debut in 2009, and has played supporting roles in television dramas such as Glass Mask (2012), You're the Best, Lee Soon-shin (2013) and 4 Legendary Witches (2014).

In October 2022, Kim signed with new agency SBD Entertainment.

Filmography

Film

Television series

Web series

Music video

References

External links 
 Kim Yoon-seo at SBD Entertainment 
 
 
 
 
 

1986 births
Living people
South Korean television actresses
South Korean film actresses
People from Seoul
Dankook University alumni